"Ghetto Mindstate" is the first single from Lil' Flip's album, I Need Mine. It features Lyfe Jennings. The song peaked at #77 on the Billboard Top R&B/Hip-Hop Singles & Tracks chart.

Other versions
These two versions were released on an EP along with the original version.
 Ghetto Mindstate (Radio Version)
 Ghetto Mindstate (Instrumental)

Music video
The music video features the actor Tristan Wilds and the late rapper Young Argo. The video premiered on BET's Access Granted on January 10, 2007.

References

2007 singles
Lil' Flip songs
Lyfe Jennings songs
Gangsta rap songs
2007 songs
Warner Records singles
Songs written by Lyfe Jennings
Songs written by Lil' Flip